Vodka Collins was a Tokyo-based Japanese-American rock band, formed in 1971. The core band members were drummer Hiroshi Oguchi (formerly of The Tempters), singer-guitarist Alan Merrill, singer-guitarist Hiroshi "Monsieur" Kamayatsu (formerly of The Spiders)  and bassist Take Yokouchi (formerly of the Four Leaves touring band, High Society). In later reunion recordings in the 1990s, Yokouchi was replaced by Masayoshi "Mabo" Kabe (formerly of The Golden Cups) on bass guitar.

Most of the band's released works were original compositions by the lead singer Alan Merrill. The band recorded four albums, the most well known being the glam rock Tokyo – New York, released in 1973 on Toshiba EMI Records. Other album titles are Chemical Reaction, Pink Soup', Boy's Life  and greatest hits compilation Boys In The Band. The band's most notable contribution was recording and releasing one of the first singles in the glam rock genre in Japanese, 1973's double A-sided single "Sands Of Time"  and "Automatic Pilot" on Toshiba Express records.

Vodka Collins were the opening act on the Jackson 5's first show in Japan on April 27, 1973, at the Imperial Theater in Tokyo. The show was broadcast live on Fuji Television.

The band's founding member and drummer Hiroshi Oguchi died January 25, 2009. A memorial concert was given for him by all surviving band members on January 25, 2010, at the Duo Exchange in Tokyo, with Grico Tomioka taking Oguchi's place on drums. The band's rhythm guitarist, Monsieur Kamayatsu, died on March 1, 2017. Lead singer Alan Merrill hosted a memorial concert for Kamayatsu with star guests in Tokyo in April 2017 at the Duo Music Exchange. Merrill and Kabe both died in 2020.

Discography
 Tokyo – New York (1973)
 Chemical Reaction (1996)
 Pink Soup (1997)
 Boy's Life (outtakes compilation, 1998)
 Boys In The Band (greatest hits compilation, 2004)

References

External links
 Vodka Collins website
 Vodka Collins fansite
 Vodka Collins site
 Author Julian Cope's Vodka Collins research
 Keith Cahoon's Nippop webpages

Japanese rock music groups
Japanese glam rock musical groups
Musical groups established in 1971
Musical groups from Tokyo